Transcension may refer to:

 Transcension (novel), a 2002 science fiction novel by Damien Broderick 
 Transcension, a 2012 album by the band Sleepers Awake
 "Transcension", a song by American jazz saxophonist Ernest Dawkins from the 2000 album Jo'burg Jump
 Transcension Hypothesis

See also
 Transtension